The 1991 Las Vegas mayoral election took place on April 2, 1991 to elect the mayor of Las Vegas, Nevada. The election was held concurrently with various other local elections, and was officially nonpartisan. It saw the election of Jan Laverty Jones. With Jones winning a majority in the initial round of the election, no runoff was needed.

Jones' election as mayor made her the first woman ever to serve in any capacity on the Las Vegas City Council.

Jones was seen as having won, in part, due to strong support from female voters and strong support from trade unions.

Results

References

1991
1991 Nevada elections
1991 United States mayoral elections